The Woodrow Wilson International Center for Scholars (or Wilson Center) is a quasi-government entity and think tank which conducts research to inform public policy. Located in the Ronald Reagan Building and International Trade Center in Washington, D.C., it is a United States presidential memorial that was established as part of the Smithsonian Institution by an act of Congress in 1968. So-named for Woodrow Wilson's achievement of being the only president of the United States to hold a PhD, the center is also a think tank, ranked multiple times by the University of Pennsylvania's Think Tanks and Civil Societies Program as among the ten best in the world.

On January 28, 2021, Mark Andrew Green was announced as the Wilson Center's next president, director and CEO. He began his term on March 15, 2021.

Organization and funding

The center was established within the Smithsonian Institution, but it has its own board of trustees, composed both of government officials and of individuals from private life appointed by the president of the United States. The center also publishes a digital magazine, the Wilson Quarterly.

The center is a public–private partnership. Approximately one-third of the center's operating funds come annually from an appropriation from the U.S. government, and the center itself is housed in a wing of the Ronald Reagan Building, a federal office building where the center enjoys a 30-year rent-free lease. The remainder of the center's funding comes from foundations, grants and contracts, corporations, individuals, endowment income, and subscriptions. Because of its historic reliance on congressional appropriations, the center posts on its website a Plan for Federal Funding Hiatus.

Administration
The board of trustees, currently led by Bill Haslam, are appointed to six-year terms by the president of the United States.

Director, president, and CEO of the Wilson Center: Mark Andrew Green

Board of Directors
 Chairman: Bill Haslam, former governor of Tennessee
Vice chair: Drew Maloney
 Private citizen members:
 Nick Adams (commentator), Foundation for Liberty and American Greatness (FLAG) 
 Thelma Duggin, president, AnBryce Foundation
 Brian Hook, former U.S. special representative for Iran; senior policy advisor to the Secretary of State; and vice chairman, Cerberus Global Investments
 David Jacobson, former U.S. ambassador to Canada and vice chair, BMO Financial Group
 Timothy Pataki, former director of the Office of Public Liaison
 Alan N. Rechtschaffen, private investor; senior lecturer of laws, New York University  
 Louis Susman, former U.S. ambassador to the United Kingdom
 Public members:
 Antony Blinken, secretary, U.S. Department of State
 Lonnie Bunch, secretary, Smithsonian Institution
 Miguel Cardona, secretary, U.S. Department of Education
 David Ferriero, archivist of the United States
 Carla Hayden, librarian of Congress
 Shelly Lowe, chair, National Endowment for the Humanities
 Xavier Becerra, secretary, U.S. Department of Health and Human Services

Programs
Most of the center's staff form specialized programs and projects covering broad areas of study. Key programs include: the Cold War International History Project, Environmental Change and Security Program, History and Public Policy Program, Kennan Institute, the Kissinger Institute, the Environmental Change and Security Program, and the North Korea International Documentation Project.

See also
 A National Strategic Narrative - A report published by the center in 2011
 Presidential memorials in the United States

References

External links

1968 establishments in Washington, D.C.
Think tanks established in 1968
Think tanks based in Washington, D.C.
Foreign policy and strategy think tanks in the United States
Monuments and memorials in Washington, D.C.
Smithsonian Institution
Woodrow Wilson